In particle physics, the baryon number is a strictly conserved additive quantum number of a system. It is defined as

where nq is the number of quarks, and n is the number of antiquarks. Baryons (three quarks) have a baryon number of +1, mesons (one quark, one antiquark) have a baryon number of 0, and antibaryons (three antiquarks) have a baryon number of −1. Exotic hadrons like pentaquarks (four quarks, one antiquark) and tetraquarks (two quarks, two antiquarks) are also classified as baryons and mesons depending on their baryon number.

Baryon number vs. quark number 

Quarks carry not only electric charge, but also charges such as color charge and weak isospin. Because of a phenomenon known as color confinement, a hadron cannot have a net color charge; that is, the total color charge of a particle has to be zero ("white"). A quark can have one of three "colors", dubbed "red", "green", and "blue"; while an antiquark may be either "anti-red", "anti-green" or "anti-blue".

For normal hadrons, a white color can thus be achieved in one of three ways: 
A quark of one color with an antiquark of the corresponding anticolor, giving a meson with baryon number 0,
Three quarks of different colors, giving a baryon with baryon number +1,
Three antiquarks of different anticolors, giving an antibaryon with baryon number −1.

The baryon number was defined long before the quark model was established, so rather than changing the definitions, particle physicists simply gave quarks one third the baryon number. Nowadays it might be more accurate to speak of the conservation of quark number.

In theory, exotic hadrons can be formed by adding pairs of quarks and antiquarks, provided that each pair has a matching color/anticolor. For example, a pentaquark (four quarks, one antiquark) could have the individual quark colors: red, green, blue, blue, and antiblue. In 2015, the LHCb collaboration at CERN reported results consistent with pentaquark states in the decay of bottom Lambda baryons.

Particles not formed of quarks

Particles without any quarks have a baryon number of zero. Such particles are
 leptons — the electron, muon, tauon, and their corresponding neutrinos
 vector bosons — the photon, W and Z bosons, gluons
 Higgs boson — the only known fundamental scalar boson
 graviton — a hypothetical tensor boson

Conservation

The baryon number is conserved in all the interactions of the Standard Model, with one possible exception. The conservation is due to  global symmetry of the QCD Lagrangian. 'Conserved' means that the sum of the baryon number of all incoming particles is the same as the sum of the baryon numbers of all particles resulting from the reaction. The one exception is the hypothesized Adler–Bell–Jackiw anomaly in electroweak interactions; however, sphalerons are not all that common and could occur at high energy and temperature levels and can explain electroweak baryogenesis and leptogenesis. Electroweak sphalerons can only change the baryon and/or lepton number by 3 or multiples of 3 (collision of three baryons into three leptons/antileptons and vice versa). No experimental evidence of sphalerons has yet been observed.

The hypothetical concepts of grand unified theory (GUT) models and supersymmetry allows for the changing of a baryon into leptons  and antiquarks (see B − L), thus violating the conservation of both baryon and lepton numbers.  Proton decay would be an example of such a process taking place, but has never been observed.

The conservation of baryon number is not consistent with the physics of black hole evaporation via Hawking radiation. It is expected in general that quantum gravitational effects violate the conservation of all charges associated to global symmetries. The violation of conservation of baryon number led John Archibald Wheeler to speculate on a principle of mutability for all physical properties.

See also
Lepton number
Flavour (particle physics)
Isospin
Hypercharge
Proton decay
B − L

References

Baryons
Conservation laws
Nuclear physics
Quantum chromodynamics
Quarks
Standard Model
Flavour (particle physics)